Makiyamaia scalaria is a species of sea snail, a marine gastropod mollusk in the family Clavatulidae.

Description

Distribution
This marine species occurs off Cape Point, South Africa

References

  Barnard K.H. (1958), Contribution to the knowledge of South African marine Mollusca. Part 1. Gastropoda; Prosobranchiata: Toxoglossa; Annals of The South African Museum v. 44 p. 73–163
 Tucker JK. Catalog of Recent and fossil turrids (Mollusca, Gastropoda) Zootaxa. 2004;682:1–1295
  R.N. Kilburn, Fedosov A.E. & Olivera B.M. (2012) Revision of the genus Turris Batsch, 1789 (Gastropoda: Conoidea: Turridae) with the description of six new species. Zootaxa 3244: 1–58

Endemic fauna of South Africa
scalaria
Gastropods described in 1958